A number of units of measurement were used in Estonia to measure length, mass, area, capacity, etc.

Units used during the first half of the 20th century
Several units were used in Estonia.  These units were Russian and local units.

Length

Several units were used in Estonia to measure length.  One archine (Russian) was equal to 0.7112 m.

1 elle (Kuunar) = 0.75 archine

1 Foute = 3/7 archine

1 faden = 3 archine.

Mass

A number of units were used in Estonia to measure mass.  One pfund was equal to 430 g (0.430 kg).  Some other units are provided below:

1 quent = 1/128 pfund

1 loth = 1/32 pfund

1 liespfund = 20 pfund

1 centner = 120 pfund

1 tonne = 240 pfund

1 schiffspfund = 400 pfund.

Area

Several units were used in Estonia to measure area.

Reval (now Tallinn) 

Some of Reval units are given below:

1 lofstelle = 1855 m2

1 tonnland = 5462.7 m2.

Livonian

Some of the Livonian units are given below:

1 lofstelle = 3710 m2 (accuracy is up to 3 digits)

1 tonnaland = 5194 m2.

Capacity

A number of units were used to measure capacity.  1 hulmit was equal to 11.48 L.

Reval

One lof (Reval) was equal to 3 hulmit.

Livonian

One lof (Livonian) was equal to 6 hulmit.  One tonne (Livonian) was equal to 12 hulmit.

References

Estonian culture
Estonia